#MyLastShot is a gun-violence prevention campaign created by students from Columbine High School and activists passionate about the issue. The project involves students placing stickers on their driver's licenses, student ID's, or phones that states their wishes to have the graphic photos of their bodies publicized if they die in a shooting. The project launched on March 27, 2019, less than one month before the 20th anniversary of the Columbine Shooting which took place on April 20, 1999.

Participation 

The project's website states that #MyLastShot is an 'open-source gun violence prevention resource' and that groups wanting to use their sticker or any of their campaign materials are welcome to do so without having to ask permission. As of August 2019, #MyLastShot claims to have sent out nearly 65,000 stickers to students and activists across the nation.

Responses 
While many applauded the students efforts, there were also many who opposed the need to show graphic images, in the fear that these photos might further desensitize a nation that has not changed its position on gun-control in decades.

Responses From Elected Officials 
On March 28, Senator Julie Gonzales (D), Colorado, referenced #MyLastShot in her speech before voting 'yes' on the Colorado Extreme Risk Protection Orders bill that passed 18–17 in the state senate. In her speech, Sen. Gonzales said, "Current high school students from Columbine High have created a website called mylastshot.org where they are asking fellow students to put a sticker on the back of their driver licenses to let the media and others know that if they die in a mass shooting, that they want the photos of their death to be publicized."

Colorado State Representative Tom Sullivan also threw in his support of #MyLastShot in light of his own son's tragic murder in the Aurora theatre shooting. He went on to state that people need to see the photos, and that he keeps the graphic images of his son's crime scene photos on his phone to show legislators in an effort to create change. In an interview with Denver7 on the #MyLastShot Project, Rep. Sullivan said, "Alex was only shot one time. It came in from his left side. He's lying on the floor in floor 12. He was wearing khaki pants and a red shirt. The impact of our story, once you hear it over and over again, is that it wasn’t fazing anybody,” Sullivan said. “Maybe they need to see some of these pictures."

#MyLastShot vs. Media Ethics 
On March 28, 2019, Denver7 News reported on #MyLastShot pointing out how the Poynter Institute for Media Ethics typically is against the release of graphic imagery. On their website under 'Best Practices Offered For Media Coverage of Mass Shootings' they state "Be sensitive and cautious about using visual images, rather than showing graphic images of the crime scene." However, about one week after launch, Al Tompkins of the Poynter Institute wrote an article about the #MyLastShot Project giving journalists and photographers guidelines should they come upon the body of an individual with a #MyLastShot pledge. In the article, Al Tompkins writes, "...the use of such images is situational and should not be covered by a blanket “never publish” or “always publish” policy that allows journalists to escape tough calls." This stance goes contrary to Poynter's previous guidelines to stay away from showing graphic images of the crime scene. In the same week, another large media ethics institution, Reynolds Journalism Institute gave journalist Jim MacMillan a one-year grant to create new guidelines for gun violence reporting in the United States.

References

Gun violence in the United States
Gun violence